Kamel Jendoubi (Arabic: كمال الجندوبي; born 8 August 1952 in Tunis) is a Tunisian politician and human rights activist.

Biography 
Jendoubi holds a degree from the IAE Paris and a Master of Advanced Studies
from University of Paris II Panthéon-Assas.

He is a member and the president of several human rights organizations, including the Euro-Mediterranean Human Rights Network since 2003.

In 2011, he was elected by the High Authority for the achievement of the objectives of the revolution, political reform and democratic transition as the President of the Independent Higher Authority for Realisation of the Objectives of the Revolution, Political Reform and Democratic Transition.

In October 2012, Kamel Jendoubi was again in charge of organizing elections of 2013, following a troika agreement on the future political regime. However, the voting was postponed and Chafik Sarsar, a university lecturer in constitutional law, was finally elected president of the new independent Higher Authority for elections.

On 23 January 2015, in the government of Habib Essid, he was appointed as help to the prime minister, Head of Government of Tunisia, for Relations with Constitutional Institutions and Civil Society. On 6 January 2016, he also became responsible for human rights.

On 5 December 2017, he was appointed by the Office of the United Nations High Commissioner for Human Rights to leads a group of international and regional experts to investigate on human rights violations in Yemen.

Arguments

Academic discussions 
Kamel Jendoubi enrolled at the University of Tunis in the late 1960s to pursue studies in physics and chemistry. A year later, in 1971, he moved to Paris, but failed to enroll in medical school. He therefore pursued pharmacy studies . During this time, he got to know many Tunisian immigrants and decided to leave his studies for the benefit of his human rights activities.In 1979, Kamel Jendoubi, after a short return to Tunisia, returned to France to resume studies in mathematics this time, before reorienting again, In Paris after IAE he started at Sorbonne.

Links with Qatar 
Kamel Jendoubi is the president of the Cairo Institute for Human Rights Studies, a human rights institute reputed close to Qatar. The Cairo Institute for Human Right Studies also came under fire on a number of occasions, notably for having reportedly received foreign funding. According to the newspaper Egypt Today, the Cairo Institute for Human Rights Studies accepted funding from foreign states to publish false reports about the situation in Egypt and support the Muslim Brotherhood. The Cairo Institute for Human Rights Studies has also previously enjoyed the support of the Alkarama foundation, which has, in turn, found out to be linked to Al-Qaeda.

Kamel Jendoubi also regularly attends events organised by a Qatari organisation named the National Human Rights Committee, which is close to the Qatar's royal family.

Founders of the Cairo Institute for Human Rights Studies, which is chaired by Kamel Jendoubi, have been blacklisted by Egypt for their membership with the Muslim Brotherhood.

Honours and awards
 Commander Order of the Republic (Tunisia), 2011.
 Hermès Prize for the Promotion of Freedom of Expression and Exchange of Information in the Mediterranean.

Publications
 Que vive la République ! Tunisie (1957-2017), Tunis, ed. Alif, 2018
 Tunisie dix ans et dans dix ans (collective work), Tunis, ed. Leaders, 2021
 La Tunisie vote, Récit d’un acteur engagé, Tunis, ed. Nirvana, 2021

References

Tunisian politicians
People of the Tunisian Revolution
Tunisian human rights activists
1952 births
Living people